The Miss Oregon USA competition is the pageant that selects the representative for the state of Oregon in the Miss USA pageant. It is currently produced by Pageant NW Productions based in Puyallup, Washington.

Oregon has only had limited success at Miss USA and has yet to win the title. The highest placed Miss Oregon USA was Gail Atchison who finished 2nd runner-up to Barbara Peterson in 1976.  The most recent finalist was Toneata Morgan in 2018.

Two Miss Oregon USA titleholders have formerly held the Miss Oregon Teen USA title and competed at Miss Teen USA.

The current titleholder is Manju Bangalore of Corvallis, Oregon and was crowned on October 15, 2022 at Sherwood Center for the Fine Arts in Sherwood, Oregon. She will represent Oregon for the title of Miss USA 2023.

Gallery of titleholders

Results summary
2nd runners-up: Gail Atchison (1976)
Top 10: Debbie Epperson (1984), Endia Albrante (2001), Jennifer Murphy (2004)
Top 11: Olga Calderon (1991)
Top 15/16: Maralyn Turner (1956), Joyce Collin (1962), Toye Esch (1964), Maureen Bassett (1967), Laura Smith (1970), Toneata Morgan (2018)
Oregon holds a record of 11 placements at Miss USA.

Awards
Miss Congeniality: Denise White (1994), Gabrielle Neilan (2013)
Miss Photogenic: Alaina Bergsma (2012)

Winners 
Color key

External links
 Official Website

References 

Oregon
Oregon beauty pageants
Oregon culture
Women in Oregon
1952 establishments in Oregon
Recurring events established in 1952
Annual events in Oregon